Apotoforma cimelia is a species of moth of the family Tortricidae. It is found on Madagascar.

References

Moths described in 1960
Tortricini
Moths of Madagascar